James W. Crysel (born May 18, 1937) is a retired United States Army officer who attained the rank of lieutenant general.  He was notable for his command of Second United States Army and the 25th Infantry Division.

Early life
James Wendell Crysel was born in Luverne, Alabama on May 18, 1937. He graduated from Stetson University in 1959 with a Bachelor of Science degree in business management.  He completed the Reserve Officers' Training Corps program at Stetson, and was commissioned as a second lieutenant of Infantry.  While at Stetson, Crysel also became a member of the Sigma Nu fraternity.

Military education
Crysel's professional education included: Infantry Officer Basic Course; Infantry Officer Advanced Course; Military Intelligence Officer Advanced Course; United States Army Command and General Staff College; United States Army War College; and the Capstone Military Leadership Program.

While a student at the Army War College, Crysel also completed the requirements for his Master of Science degree in public administration from Shippensburg University of Pennsylvania.

Early career
From 1963 to 1964, Crysel was assigned to Company E, 1st Airborne Battle Group, a unit of the 101st Airborne Division.  From 1964 to 1965, he served with Company B and then Headquarters and Headquarters Company, 2nd Battalion, 506th Infantry Regiment, also 101st Division unit.  During 1968, Crysel was plans and operations officer (S-3) for the Special Forces Operating Base (SFOB) at Duc Lap Camp.  In 1969, Crysel commanded B-55 Detachment, 5th Mobile Strike Force Command in Vietnam.  He was promoted to first lieutenant in 1962, captain in 1963, and major in 1967.

Crysel's field grade officer assignments included: operations officer and later officer in charge of joint military service participation for the 1973 Presidential Inauguration; executive officer of 1st Battalion, 3rd Infantry Regiment (The Old Guard); personnel staff officer in the Office of the Army's Deputy Chief of Staff for Personnel (G-1); commander, 1st Battalion, 506th Infantry Regiment; special assistant to the chief of staff, 101st Airborne Division (Air Assault); and assistant chief of staff for operations and director of plans and training (G-3), 101st Airborne Division.  His later field grade officer positions included commander of 3rd Brigade, 2nd Infantry Division, and chief of staff for 2nd Infantry Division.

Career as general officer
After receiving promotion to brigadier general, Crysel served as assistant division commander for support, 101st Airborne Division, and then as the division's assistant division commander for operations.  From 1985 to 1986, he served as director of plans for the United States Pacific Command.

Crysel received promotion to major general in 1986, and commanded the 25th Infantry Division from 1986 to 1988.  From 1988 to 1990, Crysel commanded the Total Army Personnel Agency in Alexandria, Virginia.

He was commander of Second United States Army from 1990 to 1993, and received promotion to lieutenant general.  He retired in 1993.

Awards and decorations
Crysel's awards include the Army Distinguished Service Medal and Defense Superior Service Medal.  In addition, he received: the Bronze Star Medal (with one Oak leaf cluster); Meritorious Service Medal (with four Oak Leaf Clusters); Air Medal (with numeral 4); and Army Commendation Medal (with two Oak Leaf Clusters). In addition, Crysel received: the Combat Infantryman Badge; Expert Infantryman Badge; Master Parachutist, Air Assault, and Pathfinder Badges; and the Army Staff Identification Badge.

Family
He is married to the former Trudy R. Eldridge. They have two children, Kirsten and James.  In retirement, Crysel resided in Fripp Island, South Carolina.

References

Sources

Books

Newspapers

Internet

1937 births
Living people
People from Luverne, Alabama
People from Beaufort County, South Carolina
Stetson University alumni
United States Army Command and General Staff College alumni
United States Army War College alumni
Shippensburg University of Pennsylvania alumni
United States Army generals
United States Army personnel of the Vietnam War
Recipients of the Distinguished Service Medal (US Army)
Recipients of the Defense Superior Service Medal